Protein ITFG3 also known as family with sequence similarity 234 member A (FAM234A) is a protein that in humans is encoded by the ITFG3 gene.  Here, the gene is explored as encoded by mRNA found in Homo sapiens.  The FAM234A gene is conserved in mice, rats, chickens, zebrafish, dogs, cows, frogs, chimpanzees, and rhesus monkeys. Orthologs of the gene can be found in at least 220 organisms including the tropical clawed frog, pandas, and Chinese hamsters. The gene is located at 16p13.3 and has a total of 19 exons.  The mRNA has a total of 3224 bp and the protein has 552 aa.  The molecular mass of the protein produced by this gene is 59660 Da.  It is expressed in at least 27 tissue types in humans, with the greatest presence in the duodenum, fat, small intestine, and heart.

A “Newfoundland deletion” or a0-thalassemia deletion has been found within the second intervening sequence of the FAM234A gene. The gene is associated with multiple red blood cell phenotypes in African Americans – though the exact function or effect of the gene was not entirely clear.  Review of GeneCards’ current database on the FAM234A gene provided no additional elucidation on the function of the gene.

Gene 
FAM234A is located on Chromosome 16 (234,546 - 269, 943). It is 35,398 bases long, contains 11 exons, and is oriented on the plus strand in the 5' to 3' direction. Other aliases include ITFG3, C16orf9, and gs19.

There are no known paralogs of FAM234A.

The FAM234A gene is conserved in at least 220 organisms, with no evidence for conservation of the gene in single-celled organisms. Listed below is a selection of orthologs with the estimated date of divergence from human lineage in million years ago (MYA), the accession number, and the % identity to human FAM234A. This list does not contain all of the known orthologs.

mRNA 
There are at least 11 FAM234A isoforms. Aside from the longest transcript, the other isoforms differ by truncation, primarily at the 3' end. This results in a wide variation in sequence length between isoforms.

Protein 

The FAM234A gene encodes a serine and leucine rich protein titled the "FAM234A Protein" or ITFG3. The encoded protein is 552 amino acids in length with a predicted molecular weight of 59,660Da and a basal isoelectric point of 5.84. The FAM234A protein has a notable hydrophobic region from position 49-70 in the amino acid sequence that correlates with one of the two trans-membrane regions found on FAM234A. FAM234A has membrane topology type 3a, indicating multiple trans-membrane regions with its N-terminus facing the cytosol. The protein is predicted to be located in the endoplasmic reticulum, with portions of it found within the endoplasmic reticulum lumen. Within the cell, FAM234A has also been localized to the ribosomes and nucleus.

References

Further reading